Flavicorniculum is a genus of flies in the family Tachinidae.

Species
 Flavicorniculum forficalum Chao & Shi, 1981
 Flavicorniculum hamiforceps Chao & Shi, 1981
 Flavicorniculum multisetosum Chao & Shi, 1981
 Flavicorniculum planiforceps Chao & Shi, 1981

References

Tachinidae
Endemic fauna of China